"Bring a Torch, Jeanette, Isabella" is a Christmas carol which originated from the Provence region of France in the 17th century. The song is usually notated in 3/8 time.

The carol was first published in France, and was subsequently translated into English in the 18th century. The song was originally not meant for Christmas; it was considered dance music for French nobility.

History
The carol first appeared in print in 1688 with the Provençal text Venès lèu, Vèire la piéucello; Venès lèu, Genti pastourèu! in a collection of twelve Provençal noëls by Nicolas Saboly. The popularity of the melody is attested by its use four years later by Marc-Antoine Charpentier for the drinking song, Qu'ils sont doux, bouteille jolie in a 1672 revival of Molière's Le médecin malgré lui.

To this day on Christmas Eve in Provence, children dress as shepherds and milkmaids, bringing torches and candles while singing the carol on their way to Midnight Mass.

Lyrics
The characters "Jeannette" and "Isabelle/Isabella" are two female farmhands who have found the Baby Jesus and his mother Mary in a stable. Excited by this discovery, they run to a nearby village to tell the inhabitants, who rush to see the new arrivals. Visitors to the stable are urged to keep their voices quiet, so the newborn can enjoy his dreams.

References

Christmas carols
French-language Christmas carols